Iwona is a Polish female name derived from the French name Yvonne.

People

Iwona may refer to:

Iwona Blazwick OBE (born 1955), art critic and lecturer, Director of the Whitechapel Art Gallery in London
Iwona Buczkowska (born 1953), award-winning Polish-born French architect and urban planner
Iwona Chmielewska (born 1960), Polish author and illustrator, who publishes mainly for children
Iwona Daniluk (born 1973), Polish biathlete
Iwona Filipowicz (born 1976), Polish former competitive ice dancer
Katarzyna Iwona Jurkowska-Kowalska (born 1992), Polish female artistic gymnast and twice Polish all-around champion
Iwona Kuczyńska (born 1961), former professional tennis player from Poland
Iwona Lewandowska (born 1985), Polish long distance runner who specialises in the marathon
Iwona Marcinkiewicz (born 1975), athlete from Poland
Iwona Matkowska (born 1982), Polish freestyle wrestler
Iwona Niedźwiedź (born 1979), Polish handball player
Iwona Pyżalska, Polish sprint canoeist who competed in the mid-2000s
Iwona Śledzińska-Katarasińska (born 1941), Polish politician
Iwona Sobotka (born 1981), Polish soprano and Grand Prix Winner of the Queen Elizabeth Music Competition
Iwona Stroynowski (born 1950), Polish-born American immunologist, Professor at University of Texas Southwestern Medical Center

See also
Iona
Iwon (disambiguation)
WONA (disambiguation)

Polish feminine given names
Given names
Feminine given names

de:Iwona